Abraham González Casanova (born 16 July 1985), known simply as Abraham, is a Spanish professional footballer who plays for Cypriot club Akritas Chlorakas as a central midfielder.

Club career
Born in Barcelona, Catalonia, Abraham made his professional debut with local Terrassa FC, appearing in 16 matches during the 2004–05 season in the Segunda División, which ended in relegation.

Two years later, he was bought by neighbours FC Barcelona, being immediately assigned to its reserve side which competed in Tercera División. He made his debut for the first team during the Copa del Rey tie against Benidorm CF (1–0 win) on 28 October 2008. In the last round of La Liga, as Barça were already champions, he came on as a substitute for Xavi during the 1–1 draw at Deportivo de La Coruña.

Abraham was released by Barcelona in the summer of 2009, joining Cádiz CF as the club had just returned to the second division after a one-year absence. He appeared regularly for the Andalusians, who were immediately relegated.

Abraham signed with Gimnàstic de Tarragona for the 2010–11 campaign, but failed to impress at his new club. In the following transfer window he was loaned to fellow league side SD Ponferradina, eventually suffering another relegation.

On 15 July 2011, Abraham joined AD Alcorcón also in the second tier. After two seasons as a starter (missing promotion in the play-offs on both occasions), he moved to La Liga with RCD Espanyol.

Abraham scored his first goal in the Spanish top flight on 27 February 2015, the game's only in a home victory over Córdoba CF. On 17 June 2016, after three seasons with an average of 21 league appearances, the 30-year-old moved abroad for the first time in his career, signing with Club Universidad Nacional from the Liga MX as a free agent.

Career statistics

Honours
Barcelona
La Liga: 2008–09
Copa del Rey: 2008–09

References

External links

Stats and bio at Cadistas1910 

1985 births
Living people
Spanish footballers
Footballers from Barcelona
Association football midfielders
La Liga players
Segunda División players
Segunda División B players
Terrassa FC footballers
FC Barcelona Atlètic players
FC Barcelona players
Cádiz CF players
Gimnàstic de Tarragona footballers
SD Ponferradina players
AD Alcorcón footballers
RCD Espanyol footballers
Liga MX players
Club Universidad Nacional footballers
Lobos BUAP footballers
C.D. Veracruz footballers
Cypriot First Division players
AEK Larnaca FC players
Ethnikos Achna FC players
Akritas Chlorakas players
Catalonia international footballers
Spanish expatriate footballers
Expatriate footballers in Mexico
Expatriate footballers in Cyprus
Spanish expatriate sportspeople in Mexico
Spanish expatriate sportspeople in Cyprus